Guglielmo Fieschi was an Italian cardinal and cardinal-nephew of Pope Innocent IV, his uncle, who elevated him on May 28, 1244.

He was born between 1210 and 1220 in Genoa, but nothing is known about his life before his elevation to the cardinalate. As cardinal, he received the title of deacon of Sant'Eustachio. He subscribed with this title the papal bulls issued between September 27, 1244, and August 28, 1255. He accompanied his uncle the pope in his escape from Rome in 1244 and went with him to Genoa, and then to France. He participated in the First Council of Lyon in 1245. He served as papal legate in various parts of Italy in 1252–54. He was one of the cardinal-electors in the papal election, 1254. He acted also as protector of the orders of the Servites (1251) and the Humiliati (1253). He died before May 1, 1256.

References

13th-century Italian cardinals
Cardinal-nephews
13th-century births
1256 deaths
Fieschi family